The Wild Girl is a 1917 American silent comedy film directed by Howard Estabrook and starring Eva Tanguay, Stuart Holmes, and Tom Moore.

Cast
 Eva Tanguay as Firefly 
 Stuart Holmes as Andrio 
 Tom Moore as Donald MacDonald 
 Dean Raymond as Undetermined Role 
 Valerie Bergere as Undetermined Role 
 John Davidson as Undetermined Role 
 Herbert Evans as Leo 
 Nora Cecil as Undetermined Role

References

Bibliography
 Andrew L. Erdman. Queen of Vaudeville: The Story of Eva Tanguay. Cornell University Press, 2012 .

External links

 

1917 films
1917 comedy films
1910s English-language films
American silent feature films
Silent American comedy films
Films directed by Howard Estabrook
American black-and-white films
Selznick Pictures films
1910s American films